Baltimore Hebrew Congregation is a synagogue and Jewish community in Baltimore. It is affiliated with the Reform Judaism movement.

Originally named Nidche Yisroel, the synagogue was founded in 1830, and for the first fifteen years of its existence, services were held in a small room above a local grocery. It was originally an Orthodox synagogue, but became Reform officially in 1871. The pressure from the Congregation for modernization was such that its Orthodox first rabbi, Abraham Rice, resigned his position in 1849 over this question.

In 1845, the congregation moved to Lloyd Street under the new name, Baltimore Hebrew Congregation. The new synagogue was dedicated by the Rev. S. M. Isaacs of New York and the Rev. Isaac Leeser of Philadelphia, together with the ministers of the congregation, Abraham Rice and A. Ansell (Anshel). That building, the Lloyd Street Synagogue, the third-oldest synagogue building in the United States, is now preserved as part of the Jewish Museum of Maryland. As the city of Baltimore and its Jewish population continued to grow, so too did the number of congregants, and thus also the size of its endowment. Thus, in 1891, the congregation moved to Madison Avenue, where it built a brand new building. This building, the Baltimore Hebrew Congregation Synagogue, was added to the National Register of Historic Places in 1976. As the Jewish population of Baltimore moved northwest, the congregation relocated to Park Heights Avenue in 1951 on the border of Baltimore City and Baltimore County.

The Day School at Baltimore Hebrew 

Under the direction of Rabbi Murray Saltzman, BHC senior rabbi at the time, BHC added a day school to its educational programming in 1991 for children from 18 months through 8th grade.  In early 2008, it was officially renamed The Day School at Baltimore Hebrew.  The Day School received accreditation from the State of Maryland and the Association of Independent Maryland Schools (AIMS), was a member of the Center for Jewish Education of The Associated, Progressive Association of Reform Day Schools (PARDeS) and The Association of Independent Schools (NAIS). It closed after the 2012–2013 school year.  It was slated to reopen as a new school, The Independent Academy, as a joint venture with The Cardin School, but the Cardin school pulled out and closed and the new school did not materialize.

Notable congregants

 Steve Krulevitz (born 1951), American-Israeli tennis player

See also

Oldest synagogues in the United States

References

External links
 

1830 establishments in Maryland
Jewish day schools in Maryland
Reform Jewish day schools
Reform synagogues in Maryland
Religious organizations established in 1830
Synagogues in Baltimore